Barouh Vojtec Berkovits (May 7, 1926 – October 23, 2012) was one of the pioneers of bio-engineering, particularly the cardiac defibrillator and artificial cardiac pacemaker. In particular, Berkovits invented the "demand pacemaker" and the DC defibrillator.

Biography
Berkovits was born in Czechoslovakia. His parents and sister were murdered at Auschwitz. He immigrated to the United States in the 1950s, and worked for the pacemaker company Medtronic from 1975 until his retirement. In 1982, Berkovits received the "Distinguished Scientist Award" from the Heart Rhythm Society. He graduated from the New York University Tandon School of Engineering in 1956. He was also a faculty member at NYU Tandon.

References

Cardiac electrophysiologists
1926 births
2012 deaths
American bioengineers
People from Lučenec
Polytechnic Institute of New York University faculty
Polytechnic Institute of New York University alumni